Diarsenic tetraiodide is an inorganic compound of arsenic and iodine. It is a dark red metastable solid.  The compound is a closely related to the better characterized diphosphorus tetraiodide. Identified in the late 19th century with the (accurate) empirical formula AsI2, the compound was assigned the formula (As2I4) several years later.

References

Further reading

 
 

Iodides
Arsenic halides